Zoran Lukić (born 7 September 1971) is a Serbian professional basketball coach. He currently serves as the head coach for Nizhny Novgorod of the VTB United League and the FIBA Europe Cup, and the Russian national team.

Coaching career 
Lukić started his coaching career in 1995 when he joined the coaching staff of Serbian team Beopetrol (later renamed to Atlas). He worked there as an assistant coach under Zoran Krečković, Slobodan Klipa, Predrag Badnjarević, and Zoran Slavnić.

In August 2006, Lukić came to Russia, becoming the head coach for CSKA Moscow 2, a youth system of CSKA Moscow.

Nizhny Novgorod (2008–2014) 
In September 2008, Nizhny Novgorod and its general manager Panov hired Lukić as their new head coach. In his second season (2009–10) as the head coach of Nizhny, he won the 2nd-tier Russian SuperLeague B, and got promoted to the Russian Professional League for the 2010–11 season. On 16 March 2011, Lukić and Nizhny had a 80–53 loss to Spartak Saint Petersburg in the Russian Cup Final. In June 2011, Lukić signed a two-year contract extension with Nizhny Novgorod.

On 30 June 2014, Lukić terminated his contract with Nizhny Novgorod on mutual agreement.

Banvit (2014–2015) 
On 4 July 2014, Turkish team Banvit hired Lukić as their new head coach. On 18 January 2015, Lukić was the head coach for Team Asia at the Turkish League All-Star Game. On 18 February 2015, his team had a 89–64 loss to Pınar Karşıyaka in the 2014–15 Turkish Cup Quarterfinal. On the next day, he parted ways with Banavit following the loss in the Turkish Cup Quarterfinal. He finished his term with a 10–6 record in the Turkish League and with a 10–6 record in EuroCup.

Nizhny Novgorod (2017–present) 
In March 2017, Lukić returned to Nizhny Novgorod as a sports director. In April 2017, he became their new head coach, succeeding Artūrs Štālbergs.

National team coaching career 
In 2006, Lukić was the head coach of the India national team.

Lukić was an assistant coach of the Russia national U16 team at the 2008 FIBA Europe Under-16 Championship in Chieti, Italy.

In October 2021, the Russian Basketball Federation hired Lukić as new head coach for the Russian national team.

References

External links
 Zoran Lukic at eurobasket.com
 Zoran Lukic at FIBAEurope.com
 Zoran Lukić at Euroleague.net

1971 births
Living people
Banvit B.K. coaches
Basketbol Süper Ligi head coaches
Serbian expatriate basketball people in Russia
Serbian expatriate basketball people in Turkey
Serbian expatriate basketball people in India
Serbian men's basketball coaches
Sportspeople from Belgrade